Two Into One is a 1984 farce written by English playwright Ray Cooney.

It had a long run at the Shaftesbury Theatre starring Donald Sinden and Michael Williams.

Ray Cooney's Theatre of Comedy Company bought the theatre during the run.

References 

1984 plays
West End plays
Comedy plays
Plays by Ray Cooney
Laurence Olivier Award-winning plays